Community Church of Gonzales is a historic Gothic Revival church building at 301 4th Street in Gonzales, California, United States.  It was built 1883–1884 and added to the National Register of Historic Places in 1983.  It is one of Monterey County's oldest functioning churches, a prominent Carpenter Gothic church exemplifying a type common to late-19th-century small California towns. It is currently a church of the Presbyterian Church (USA).

References

External links

Churches in Monterey County, California
Carpenter Gothic church buildings in California
Churches on the National Register of Historic Places in California
Churches completed in 1884
National Register of Historic Places in Monterey County, California